The Toronto Rush is a semi-professional ultimate franchise based in Toronto, Ontario, Canada. The Rush joined the American Ultimate Disc League’s East division in the 2013 season – becoming the first Canadian AUDL team to join. They went undefeated that year, and continued their streak into the playoffs to take home the 2013 AUDL Championship in their introductory season. The Rush franchise has been the model of consistency. With five consecutive East Division titles, three appearances in League Championship Finals, and one AUDL title in 2013, fans have come to expect to seeing this team excel on and off the field. Robert Lloyd is the current chairman of the Rush. Their head coach for the 2020 season is Adrian Yearwood.

References

External links
 Official website

Ultimate (sport) teams
2013 establishments in Ontario
Ultimate teams established in 2013
Sports teams in Toronto